By-elections in Hungary occur to fill vacant constituency seats in the National Assembly of Hungary. Vacant list seats are filled by the next member of the list of the respective MP. If there are no more members on the list, the seat is left vacant.

By-elections

2018–2022 Parliament

2014–2018 Parliament

2010–2014 Parliament

2006–2010 Parliament

2002–2006 Parliament

1998–2002 Parliament

1994–98 Parliament
No by-election was held during this cycle.

1990–94 Parliament

See also
Elections in Hungary

Notes

References

Elections in Hungary